The Kingdom of Kaikan, also known as Kikan was a Jat kingdom in present-day Pakistan. It played an important role in protecting Sindh from Arab invasions. Over a period of 20 years, the Jats of Kaikan repulsed six invasions from the Umayyad Caliphate.

History
Kaikan was named after a mountain, was a small province in Sindh near the Bolan Pass. 

The forth Khalifa Ali sent Arab (second) expedition to Sindh under Harish Ibn Murrah in 660. He reached Kaikan with a Large Army, the native of Kaikan stood up to fight with them. The Jats put up tough fight against the Arabian Invaders and decisively repulsed attack the attack. Harish along with followers was killed in Battle. During the next twenty years , they made desperate efforts to destroy the Jats but failed. Muslim general Haras ibn Marra-al-Abdi volunteered to attack Sindh, and the Caliph sanctioned the expedition. After a successful raid in 662, Haras turned his attention to Kikan. Haras had outfitted a formidable Muslim army comprising nobles and chiefs. This army encountered no real opposition till it reached the treacherous terrain of Kikan.

The fifth Caliph Mu'awiya I sent next (third) expedition under Abdullah Ibn Sawad with 4000 soldiers to Sindh. When they arrived in Kaikan Abdullah and his army assaulted by the Jat soldiers of Provincial Chiefs and fierce battle took place between to Armies. The Jats of Kaikan also came out in large number to fight the marauders the occupied mountain passes and battle raged furiously. Abdullah's troop were defeated by Jats and eventually, the army of islamic Arab was made to flee to Makran. In this Battle Abdullah Ibn Sawad was also Killed.

The Caliph Mu'awiya I send another (fourth) Arab expedition in 664, against Hind under the commander Muhallab Ibn Abu Sufra. Muhallab advanced on Indian fournier as far as Banna (Banu) and Alahwaz (Lahore) two places situated between Kabul and Multan. He then proceed southwards to Kikan but trounced by the Jats and Muhallab and his Man were killed in the battle.

In an extraordinary battle, the Jats repelled them, outclassing a vastly superior military force; superior in number, training, equipment and war experience. Haras himself was killed, and only a handful of his large force scampered back to report the disaster to the Caliph. The casualties on the Jat side were quite significant but the Arab invaders had been decisively repulsed. This was a huge blow to the Caliph, and so, for the next twenty years, every successive Caliph made Kikan a special target for conquest and sent as many as six expeditions, five of which shattered miserably and ‘failed to make any permanent impression’  in Sindh.

When Muhammad bin Qasim (694-715) invaded Sindh, Kaikan country was in independent possession of Jats. The country of Kaikan was supposed to be in south-eastern Afghanistan which was conquered from the Jats by the Arab general Amran Bin Musa in the reign of the Khalifa Al-Mutasim-bi-llah, (833-881). During the same reign another expedition was sent against the Jats who had seized upon the roads of Hajar and spread terror over the roads and planted posts in all directions towards the desert. They were overcome after a bloody conflict of twenty five days. 27,000 of them were led in captivity to grace the triumph of victor. It was a custom among these people to blow their horns when Marshalled for battle. The Jats of Kaikan fought very bravely and defeated the Arabs very badly again & again. So Arab could not attack on India by Kikkan route.

See also

Raja Dahir
History of Sindh

References

Bibliography 

 

Geography of Sindh
History of Sindh
Jat